James Thomas Dauterive (born June 22, 1957) is an American animation producer and writer, widely known for his work on King of the Hill (1997–2010) and Bob's Burgers (2011–2020).

Personal life 
Dauterive was born on June 22, 1957. Like his namesake character on King of the Hill, William Fontaine de la Tour "Bill" Dauterive, his family is of Louisiana Cajun origin. He has served on the Board of Trustees for Bridges Academy since 2017.

King of the Hill
After a ten-year career as an advertising copywriter in Philadelphia, Dauterive joined King of the Hill as a writer at its inception in 1996. He was also an executive producer on the show and wrote multiple episodes, including:
"Strangeness on a Train", "The Redneck on Rainey Street", "Glen Peggy Glen Ross", "To Sirloin with Love" (co-writer), "What Happens at the National Propane Gas Convention in Memphis Stays at the National Propane Gas Convention in Memphis", "The Son That Got Away", "The Company Man", "Snow Job" (co-writer), "Junkie Business", "Nine Pretty Darn Angry Men", "Hank's Cowboy Movie", "A Beer Can Named Desire", "Church Hopping", "The Trouble with Gribbles", "Hanky Panky" and "The Perils of Polling".

References

External links

American television writers
American male television writers
Television producers from Texas
Living people
1957 births
Writers from Dallas
Bryan Adams High School alumni
Screenwriters from Texas
Cajun writers
University of Texas at Austin alumni
Harvard University alumni